Escape and evasion lines in World War II helped people escape European countries occupied by Nazi Germany. The focus of most escape lines in Western Europe was assisting British and American airmen shot down over occupied Europe to evade capture and escape to neutral Spain or Sweden from where they could return to the United Kingdom. A distinction is sometimes made between "escapers" (soldiers and airmen who had been captured by the Germans and escaped) and "evaders" (soldiers and airmen in enemy territory who evaded capture). Most of those helped by escape lines were evaders. 

Some escape and evasion lines such as the Shelbourne or Burgundy Lines were created by the Allies specifically to assist their soldiers and airmen stranded in German-occupied territory. Others were the product of a combination of allied military personnel and local citizens in occupied territory, such as the Pat O'Leary Line. Some escape lines were created and operated by civilians as grass-roots efforts to help people fleeing the Nazis, such as Comet, Dutch-Paris, Service EVA or the Smit-van der Heijden line, and did not restrict themselves to helping military personnel but also helped compromised spies, resisters, men evading the forced labor drafts, civilians who wanted to join the governments-in-exile in London, and Jews.

About 7,000 airmen and soldiers, mostly British and American, were helped to evade German capture in Western Europe and successfully returned to the United Kingdom during World War II. Many of the escape lines were financed in whole or part by MI9 of the British Directorate of Military Intelligence and other Allied organizations. "Participation in the escape networks was arguably the most dangerous form of resistance work in occupied Europe...The most perilous job of all was handled mostly by young women, many of them still in their teens, who escorted the servicemen hundreds of miles across enemy territory to Spain."

Description
The work of the escape lines was labor-intensive. Typically, downed airmen were found, fed, clothed, given false identity papers, and hidden in attics, cellars, and people's homes by a network of volunteers. Airmen were then accompanied by guides, also volunteers, to neutral counties.  The most common routes were from Belgium and northern France to Spain. Travel through occupied France was mostly by train, followed by a crossing on foot of the Pyrenees mountains into Spain with a local guide (usually paid). Once in Spain the airmen were assisted by British diplomats to travel to Gibraltar and then were flown back to the United Kingdom. An alternate route was to travel from the coast of Brittany to England via small boat. 

Late in the war, especially after the Normandy Invasion on June 6, 1944, the escape lines turned more to sheltering airmen in place or in forest camps to await the arrival of the allied armies rather than helping the airmen to escape occupied Europe. Operation Marathon describes the forest camps.

About 2,000 soldiers, mostly British, and 2,000 British and 3,000 American airmen who had been shot down or crash landed in western Europe evaded German capture or escaped from German imprisonment during the war. Most of the soldiers were helped to evade capture because they were left behind in France after the Dunkirk evacuation of British forces in 1940. Most of the airmen were helped from 1942 to 1944 as the air war over Europe intensified. They were assisted by many different escape lines, some of them large and organized, others informal and ephemeral. The Royal Air Forces Escaping Society estimated that 14,000 volunteers worked with the many escape and evasion lines during the war. Many others helped on an occasional basis, and the total number of people who, on one or more occasions helped downed airmen during the war, may have reached 100,000. One-half of the volunteer helpers were women, often young women, even teenagers. Several of the most important escape lines were headed by women.  

The work of escape line helpers was dangerous. Given the large numbers of helpers scattered over large areas, escape lines were relatively easy for the Germans to infiltrate. Thousands of helpers were arrested and more than five hundred died in concentration camps or were executed. The attrition of escape line leaders due to German arrest was much higher. In March 1943, only one 61-year old woman, Marie-Louise Dissard, remained free to re-invent the Pat O'Leary Line.  In March 1944, only three of a dozen leaders of the Comet Line, the largest and most famous of the lines, were still alive and not in prison.

Initially, escape lines were self-financed by individuals in occupied countries. However, two UK clandestine organizations, mostly MI9 but also Section DF of the Special Operations Executive (SOE), financed the large escape lines and the U.S. clandestine organization MIS-X helped prisoners of war (POWs) escape from German POW camps.

The members of the escape and evasion lines were usually unarmed and did not participate in violent resistance to the German occupation. The motto of the Comet Line, was "Pugna Quin Percutias," which means "fight without arms." To maintain tight security, escape lines usually avoided contacts with armed resistance groups.

Escapees and evaders
Organized escape and evasion lines operated in France, Belgium, the Netherlands, and Denmark.  The number of airmen evading capture after being shot down or crash landing in western Europe was a small fraction of those killed or taken prisoner. For example, about 22,000 British and American airmen were killed or captured when being downed in France, but only 3,000 are recorded as having evaded capture by the Germans. Moreover, the percentage of airmen who evaded capture in France was higher than in other countries due to the proximity of the Spanish border to France and the short ocean passage to England. Nearly all the airmen downed in Germany were killed or captured, although a few escaped from prisoner of war camps and were helped to avoid re-capture by escape lines. Lesser-known escape lines operated in eastern Europe mainly to help Polish or Czech soldiers reach the Allies via the Baltic or Italy or to help Jews escape via the Balkans.

Escape lines

 Belgian National Movement 
 Bordeaux-Loupiac Escape Network 
 Bourgogne (Burgundy) Line 
 Chauny Line
 Comet Line
 Denmark Escape Line
 Dutch-Paris Line
 Groupe Hoornaert-Dirix 
 Hornoy-le-Bourg Line
 Francois Line
 Françoise Line
 Marie Claire Line
 Marie-Odile Line
 Oaktree Line   
 Operation Marathon 
 Operation Pegasus
 Operation Sherwood
 Pat O'Leary Line (Pat Line, O'Leary Line, PAO Line)
 Possum Line (possum = I can in Latin) 
 Service EVA 
 Smit-Van der Heijden Line  
 Shelburne Line
 VAR line 
 Vic Line

Notable people

Kattalin Aguirre, Basque, Comet Line 
Robert Ayle, French, Comet Line 
Elisabeth Barbier, French, Comet, Oaktree Line  
Andrée Borrel, French, Pat Line, SOE agent 
 Vladamir Bouryschkine, American, Oaktree Line 
Georges Broussinne, French, Bourgogne Line 
Jean-Claude Camors, French, Bordeaux-Loupiac Line 
Donald Caskie, British, Pat Line 
Pat Cheramy, British, Pat Line
Harold Cole, British, Pat Line, German agent
Virginia d'Albert-Lake, American, Comet Line, Sherwood  
Madeleine Damerment, French, Pat Line, SOE agent
Monique de Bissy, Belgian, Comet Line 
Elvire de Greef, Belgian, Comet Line. 
Fernand de Greef, Belgian, Comet Line 
Frederick de Greef, Belgian, Comet Line  
Janine de Greef, Belgian, Comet Line 
Andrée de Jongh, Belgian, Comet Line  
Frédéric de Jongh, Belgian, Comet Line 
Erwin Deman, French, VAR Line 
Arnold Deppé, Belgian, Comet Line 
Jacques Desoubrie, German agent 
Marie-Louise Dissard, French, Pat, Francoise Lines 
Lucien Dumais, Canadian, Shelburne Line 
Andrée Dumon, Belgian, Comet Line 
Michelle Dumon, Belgian, Comet Line 
Antoine d’Ursel, Belgian, Comet Line 
Ian Garrow, Scot, Pat Line 
Victor Gerson, British, Vic Line, SOE agent 
Florentino Goikoetxea, Basque, Comet Line 
Jean Greindl, Belgian, Comet Line 
Albert Guérisse, Belgian, Pat line 
Elisabeth Haden-Guest, Pat Line 
Virginia Hall, American, Pat Line, SOE/OSS agent  
Suzanne Hiltermann-Souloumiac, Dutch, Dutch-Paris Line 
Paul Hoornaert, Belgian, Groupe Hoornaert-Dirix 
Catherine Janot, French, Comet Line
Albert Edward Johnson, British, Comet Line  
Herman Laatsman, Dutch, Dutch-Paris Line 
James Langley, MI9 
Jacques Legrelle, Belgian, Comet Line 
Roger Le Neveu, French, German agent
Mary Lindell, British, Marie-Clair Line  
Elsie Maréchal, British, Comet Line 
Elvire Morelle, French, Comet Line 
 Airey Neave, British, MI9 
Jean-François Nothomb, Belgian, Comet Line 
Louis Nouveau, French, Pat Line 
Andrée Peel, French, VAR Line 
Edgard Potier, Belgian, Possum Line 
George Rodocanachi, British, Pat Line
Amanda Stassart, Belgian, Comet Line
Franciose Usandizaga, Basque, Comet Line 
Nancy Wake, Australian, Pat Line, SOE agent
Gabrielle Weidner, Dutch, Dutch-Paris Line 
Johan Hendrik Weidner, Dutch, Dutch-Paris Line 
Suzanne Werenghem, French, Pat Line 
Suzanne Wittek, Belgian, Comet Line
Edmond "Moen" Chait, Belgian, Dutch-Paris Line

References

French Resistance
Belgian Resistance
Belgian resistance groups
Dutch resistance
Danish resistance groups
Special Operations Executive
World War II resistance movements
Escapes and rescues during World War II